Walter Tennyson (1899-1980) was a British actor and film director of the silent era.

Selected filmography
Actor
 The Call of the East (1922)
 The Virgin Queen (1923)
 Women and Diamonds (1924)
 Reveille (1924)
 Speeding Into Trouble (1924)
 Mutiny (1925)
 Sally, Irene and Mary (1925)
 The Infamous Lady (1928)

Director
 Father O'Flynn (1935)
 King of Hearts (1936)
 Annie Laurie (1936)
 The Body Vanished (1939)

Screenwriter
 Trouble (1933)

References

External links

1899 births
1980 deaths
Male actors from Surrey
English male film actors
English male silent film actors
English film directors
20th-century English male actors